is a Japanese curler. He represented Japan at the 1998 Winter Olympics in Nagano, where the Japanese team placed 5th. He was the skip for the Japanese team at the 2010 World Men's Curling Championship.

Teams

References

External links

1977 births
Living people
People from Kitami, Hokkaido
Japanese male curlers
Olympic curlers of Japan
Curlers at the 1998 Winter Olympics
Sportspeople from Hokkaido